Something Wicked is a book (novel) written by Carolyn Hart and published by Bantam Books (now owned by Random House) on 1 May 1988 which later went on to win the Anthony Award for Best Paperback Original in 1989.

References 

American mystery novels
Anthony Award-winning works
1988 American novels